Parinacota is a Chilean hamlet in Putre, Parinacota Province, Arica and Parinacota Region.

Location

Church

The church was built in the 17th century in the form of a central nave with two side chapels. The walls are made of stone and clay and are supported by exterior arches of unmortared stone. The floor is brick with a central band of stone. Originally there was no choir. A choir without railing was built later-on whereas one of the most interesting frescoes of the area, the Last Judgment was destroyed. The atrium is surrounded by a clay wall on which are situated several figures made of red stone: A bishop, lilies, phalli and others. The square tower was rebuilt in 1789 and painted with white lime.

Noteworthy are the frescoes in the interior which were painted in water colors by Indians in the Andean baroque of the 17th century. The Last Judgment suggests that only women were condemned. The archangel St. Michael weighs a nude woman on a scale and there are trails to get to the purgatory, over clouds to heaven as well as stairs to the mouth of a dragon which leads to hell, where there are  several torture instruments. The condemned women walk or are dragged by the hair or are ridden by demons. One of them leads the helpers of evil with a broad smile, not knowing what awaits her.

Climate
Parinacota has an alpine climate (Köppen classification ETH). Due to its high elevation, there is high diurnal temperature variation. It has cool daily maxima throughout the year due to its high elevation, but minima are below freezing for the entire year, and frigid during the bone-dry, dry season from April to November. Precipitation is low and falls almost entirely between December and March: for the remainder of the year it totals just  over eight months.

See also
List of highest towns by country

References

Hamlets in Chile
Populated places in Parinacota Province